is a fixed shooter arcade game released by Konami in Japan in 1982. It was manufactured in North America by Stern Electronics. The player controls "Mama", a pig whose babies have been kidnapped by a group of wolves.

Gameplay 
The player controls Mama Pig, whose babies have been kidnapped by a pack of wolves and who must rescue them using a bow and arrow and slabs of meat. Controls consist of a two-position up/down joystick, which moves an elevator in which Mama Pig rides; and a button, which fires arrows and throws meat.

Each level consists of two rounds. In the first, wolves descend slowly from a high ledge using balloons, which the player must shoot in order to drop them to the ground. Any wolves who reach the ground safely will climb up a set of ladders behind the elevator and try to eat Mama Pig if she moves in front of them. During the second round, the wolves start on the ground and inflate balloons in order to ascend to a cliff on which a boulder is resting so they can push it toward the edge. Airborne wolves throw rocks in both rounds, trying to hit Mama Pig. In addition, the balloon carrying the last "boss" wolf of the second round must be shot several times in order to defeat him; if he reaches the cliff, the player must defeat additional enemies before facing the boss again.

A slab of meat occasionally appears at the top of the elevator's range of motion. Picking it up allows the player to throw it, distracting any wolves on/near its trajectory and causing them to let go of their balloons and crash to the ground for bonus points. Stray balloons and dropped fruits can also be shot for extra points.

After every second round, a bonus screen is played. The first such screen requires the player to defeat a group of wolves using only meat, while the second awards points for shooting fruits thrown by the wolves. These two screens alternate after each level.

The player loses one life if Mama Pig is hit by a rock, eaten by a wolf on the ladders (first round only), or crushed by the boulder if too many wolves reach the cliff and push it over the edge (second round only). When all lives are lost, the game ends.

When the game starts, "The Other Day I Met a Bear" can be heard during the opening scene (in which the wolves kidnap Mama's babies). The first stage theme bears a very slight resemblance to the main theme music from Frogger, another Konami arcade game. The song is a part of the Desecration Rag (An Operatic Nightmare) by Felix Arndt, the portion that mimics the beginning of Antonín Dvořák's Humoresque Opus 101 Number 7. After the second stage is cleared a second time, a part of "Oh! Susanna" can be heard.

Ports

Datasoft released Pooyan programmed by Scott Spanburg for the Atari 8-bit family and Commodore 64 in 1983. It was also ported to the Atari 2600, TRS-80 Color Computer, Sord M5, MSX, Apple II, TRS-80, Tomy Tutor, PV-1000, and Famicom.

Legacy
Pooyan is included on a compilation, Konami Arcade Classics, released on the PlayStation and in arcades with the title Konami 80's AC Special. An emulated version of the game was released in 2006 for PlayStation 2 in Japan as part of the Oretachi Geasen Zoku Sono-series.

The Famicom port was released for the Virtual Console in Japan.

Hamster Corporation released the Japanese arcade version of Pooyan on Nintendo Switch and PS4 as part of its Arcade Archives series. The game was released on June 13, 2019 for the Switch in all regions, and for the PS4 in North America and Japan. It was released on July 29, 2019 for the PS4 in all other regions. Both the Switch and PS4 versions have on-screen language support for the English, French, German, Italian, Japanese, and Spanish languages.

There is a series of extra ops in Metal Gear Solid: Peace Walker known as the "Pooyan Missions", which involves shooting Fulton surface-to-air recovery balloons carrying abducted soldiers off into the air.  Sound effects and music from the arcade game are used throughout the mission.

Clones
A largely identical bootleg was sold under the name Pootan.

In other media 
 Pooyan was one of the video games adapted to manga, titled Famicom Rocky published by Coro Coro Comics from 1985 to 1987.
 Mama Pig from Pooyan made a cameo appearance in the panel manga Konami 4Koma Manga Wai Wai World, part of the Famicom Runners High.

Highest score
David Hanzman of Rochester, NY, USA, scored a world record 1,609,250 points on the arcade version of Pooyan on December 16, 1983.

References

External links
 
 Pooyan at the Arcade History database
 

1982 video games
Multiplayer and single-player video games
Stern video games
Arcade video games
Fixed shooters
MSX games
Konami games
Datasoft games
Atari 2600 games
Commodore 64 games
Konami arcade games
Virtual Console games
Atari 8-bit family games
Hamster Corporation games
TRS-80 Color Computer games
Virtual Console games for Wii U
Nintendo Entertainment System games
Nintendo Switch games
PlayStation 4 games
Vertically-oriented video games
Video games about pigs
Video games about children
Video games about families
Video games about wolves
Kidnapping in fiction
Video games featuring female protagonists
Video games developed in Japan